Yuraq Yaku (Quechua yuraq white, yaku water, "white water", also spelled Yuraj Yaco) is a  mountain in the Bolivian Andes. It is located in the Cochabamba Department, Quillacollo Province, Sipe Sipe Municipality. Yuraq Yaku lies southeast of Inka Laqaya.

References 

Mountains of Cochabamba Department